Ceroxylon quindiuense, often called Quindío wax palm, is a palm native to the humid montane forests of the Andes in Colombia and Peru.

Description

It is the tallest recorded monocot in the world. The trunk is cylindrical, smooth, light colored, covered with wax; leaf scars forming dark rings around the trunk. Fruits are globose and orange-red when ripe,  in diameter.

Taxonomy
Ceroxylon quindiuense was described by Gustav Karl Wilhelm Hermann Karsten and published in Bonplandia (Hannover) 8: 70. (1860).

Etymology:

Ceroxylon: generic name composed of the Greek words: kèròs = "wax" and xγlon = "wood", in reference to the thick white wax found on the trunks.
quindiuense: geographical epithet alluding to its location in Quindío.

Synonymy:
 Klopstockia quindiuensis H.Karst
 Ceroxylon floccosum Burret

Ecology
It grows in large and dense populations along the central and eastern Andes of Colombia (rarely in the western Colombian Andes), with a disjunct distribution in the Andes of northern Peru. It achieves a minimum reproductive age at 80 years. Wax palms provide habitats for many unique life forms, including endangered species such as the yellow-eared parrot (Ognorhynchus icterotis).

Vernacular names
Palma de cera, palma de ramo (both names in Colombia).

Conservation
Populations of Ceroxylon quindiuense are threatened by habitat disturbance, overharvesting and diseases. The fruit was used as feed for cattle and pigs. The leaves were extensively used in the Catholic celebrations of Palm Sunday; such leaves coming from young individuals which were damaged to death. That activity has been reduced severely in recent years due to law enforcement and widespread campaign. Felling of Ceroxylon quindiuense palms to obtain wax from the trunk also is an activity still going on in Colombia and Peru. The palm is recognized as the national tree of Colombia, and since the implementation of Law 61 of 1985, it is legally a protected species in that country.

Cultivation and uses
The wax of the trunk was used to make candles, especially in the 19th century. The outer part of the stem of the palm has been used locally for building houses, and was used to build water supply systems for impoverished farmers. It is cultivated as an ornamental plant in Colombia and California.

Gallery

References

quindiuense
Trees of Colombia
Trees of Peru
Flora of the Andes
Ornamental trees
Nature conservation in Colombia
Colombian culture
National symbols of Colombia
Plants described in 1859